Amantis indica is a species of praying mantis native to India.

See also
List of mantis genera and species

References

indica
Mantodea of Asia
Insects of India
Insects described in 1915